The AN/FPS-24 Radar was a long range early warning radar used by the United States Air Force Air Defense Command. It used a two-frequency signal in order to avoid fluctuation loss, which causes signals on single-frequency radars to fade in and out as the target moves. Reducing this effect results in a much steadier signal.

General Electric was the primary contractor for the design, which operated in the very high frequency (VHF) at 214 to 236 MHz.

Construction
Twelve systems were built between 1958 and 1962 at various locations around the United States. Problems with the design were revealed during initial testing Eufaula AFS (Eufaula, Alabama) in 1960, resulting in modifications. Additional problems occurred in 1961 when deployment of the first production model at Point Arena Air Force Station in California.  revealed bearing problems due to the  antenna weight.  Failures of the  hydrostatic bearing often caused the early closure of some radar sites due to catastrophic damage to the support tower, sail, and feed horn.

This tower design was also used for the AN/FPS-35 frequency diverse SAGE (Semi-Automatic Ground Environment) search radar built by Sperry Corporation. The prototype installation at Eufaula, Alabama, was perched atop a steel lattice structure tower of shorter, unconfirmed height. Acme Missiles & Construction Corp., Rockville Centre, N.Y. built the radar tower facilities at Missile Master, Pittsburgh Defense Area, Oakdale, PA. Two of the AN/FPS-24 radar installations were covered by a fiberglass dome, protecting the components from the elements. One such installation was at Cottonwood Air Force Station, Idaho. The other was at Mt Hebo Air Force Station, Oregon.

The AN/FPS-24 radar antenna reflector rotated 5 revolutions per minute (a SAGE specification) and was often the cause of interference reported by nearby residents who could hear the radar signal in television and radio broadcasts. At some locations, the radar signal was "blanked" as it passed over television broadcast antenna sites such as Mt. Loma Prieta in the Santa Cruz Mountains, California.  However, at DEFCON 3 or higher, the signal was ordered "unblanked" in all directions.

The 7.5 megawatt (maximum power) transmitter ran in normal operation at 5 MW output pulse (nearly 20 microseconds in duration) and was conveyed from the transmitter to the antenna feed horn via a  diameter rigid coaxial connector.  The feed horn consisted of a cross dipole antenna design for both A and B channels.

Post-operation
Subsequent to USAF site closures, some AN/FPS-24 radar units were upgraded to Air Route Surveillance Radar (ARSR) units for USAF-FAA joint surveillance duty.

Historical Designation
On May 10, 2016, the Santa Clara County Board of Supervisors voted unanimously to list the Almaden Air Force Station AN/FPS-24 concrete Radar Tower on the County Heritage Resource Inventory, thus giving it official historic status and demolition protection.

The  concrete buildings that supported most of the AN/FPS-24 antennas were prominent landmarks, and all remain standing.  

 AL Eufaula    (prototype, steel lattice tower, demolished)
 CA Point Arena    (first production unit, concrete, present)
 CA Almaden    (second production unit, used for benchmarking all subsequent AN/FPS-24 units, concrete tower, designated historic)
 ID Cottonwood    (steel tower, present)
 MI Port Austin    (concrete tower, present)
 MN Baudette    (concrete tower, present)
 MT Malmstrom    (steel tower, demolished)
 NC Winston-Salem    (concrete tower, present)
 PA Oakdale    (concrete tower, present)
 WA Blaine    (concrete tower, present)
 OR Mt. Hebo    (steel tower, demolished)
 ME Bucks Harbor    (steel tower, demolished)

References

External references
 AN/FPS-24 @ radomes.org
 AN/FPS-24 @ fas.org
 Winkler, David F. (1997), Searching the skies: the legacy of the United States Cold War defense radar program. Prepared for United States Air Force Headquarters Air Combat Command.

External links
 Mt. Hebo AFS AN/FPS-24 Photos: David Casteel

Ground radars
Military radars of the United States
Radars of the United States Air Force
General Electric radars
Military equipment introduced in the 1960s